The Aken Ferry, also known as the Steutz Aken Ferry, is a cable ferry across the Elbe river between Aken and Steutz in Saxony-Anhalt, Germany.

Technically, the ferry is a reaction ferry, which is propelled by the current of the water. The ferry is attached to a floating cable which is anchored firmly in the riverbed upstream of the ferry. To operate the ferry, it is angled into the current, causing the force of the current to swing the ferry across the river on the cable.

A ferry was first mentioned in Aken in 1355. It can carry up to 12 cars across the Elbe in about 5 minutes.

References 

Ferries across Elbe
Ferry transport in Saxony-Anhalt
Cable ferries in Germany